Public Landing may refer to:
Public Landing, Maryland
Public Landing, Cincinnati

See also
Landing (water transport)